This is a list of the Netherlands national football team results from 1920 to 1939. Throughout this period they played in 112 matches.

The Netherlands participated in three Summer Olympics, in 1920, in 1924 and in 1928, reaching the semi-finals in 1920 where they lost to hosts and eventual champions Belgium, and in the repechage they reached the final where they disputed the silver medal against Spain (as the actual runner-up, Czechoslovakia, had been disqualified), but lost 1-3, thus winning the Bronze medal for the second time. In 1924 they reached the semi-finals again, but lost again to the eventual champions Uruguay, and this time they failed to win Bronze with a 3-1 loss to Sweden, and finally, in 1928, they were knocked out again by the eventual champions Uruguay. The Netherlands also qualified through to two FIFA World Cups, the 1934 and 1938 editions, but failed to go any further than the round of 16 in both occasions.

Results

1920

References

External links
Results at RSSSF 

1900s in the Netherlands
1910s in the Netherlands